Peter Spring nicknamed "Cockie" is an Australian former professional rugby league footballer who played in the 1980s and 1990s. He played for Illawarra and St. George in the NSWRL competition. He also played for Hull F.C. in England.

Playing career
Spring made his first grade debut for Illawarra in round 10 of the 1986 NSWRL season against Western Suburbs at WIN Stadium. Spring would make six appearances for Illawarra in his debut season as the club finished bottom of the table and claimed the Wooden Spoon. Spring would go on to play 29 games for Illawarra over three seasons scoring two tries. 

In 1989, Spring joined St. George and made his club debut in round 7 against eventual premiers Canberra at Seiffert Oval. Spring would played a total of 24 matches for St. George. In 1991, Spring joined English side Hull F.C. where he played one season.

References

St. George Dragons players
Illawarra Steelers players
Hull F.C. players
Australian rugby league players
Rugby league props
1962 births
Living people